Isolation (physical, social or emotional) is often used to facilitate power and control over someone for an abusive purpose. This applies in many contexts such as workplace bullying, elder abuse, domestic abuse, child abuse, and cults.

Isolation reduces the opportunity of the abused to be rescued or escape from the abuse. It also helps disorient the abused and makes the abused more dependent on the abuser. The degree of power and control over the abused is contingent upon the degree of their physical or emotional isolation. 

Isolation of the victim from the outside world is an important element of psychological control. Isolation includes controlling a person's social activity: whom they see, whom they talk to, where they go and any other method to limit their access to others. It may also include limiting what material is read. It can include insisting on knowing where they are and requiring permission for medical care. The abuser exhibits hypersensitive and reactive jealousy.

Isolation can be aided by:
 economic abuse thus limiting the victim's actions as they may then lack the necessary resources to resist or escape from the abuse
 smearing or discrediting the abused amongst their community so the abused does not get help or support from others
 divide and conquer

In cults

Various isolation techniques may be used by cults:
 separating from family and community 
 taking control of the handling of the victim's resources and property 
 undoing (mind control)
 physical isolation 
 extortion/dependency tactics 
 controlling victim's access to necessities.

In workplace bullying

Isolation is a common element of workplace bullying. It includes preventing access to opportunities, physical or social isolation, withholding necessary information, keeping the target "out of the loop", ignoring or excluding.

Workplace isolation is a defined category in the workplace power and control wheel.

References

Power (social and political) concepts
Control (social and political)
Abuse
Workplace bullying
Psychological abuse
Domestic violence